Benea Reach was a Norwegian progressive metal band based in Oslo. The band was nominated for a Spellemannsprisen Award in the metal category, and at one time included noted guitarist Christer Espevoll of progressive metal band Extol.

History
Benea Reach was formed on 22 March 2003 by drummer Marco Storm and vocalist Ilkka Volume of Selfmindead fame. They were joined by Morten (bass guitar), Tor (guitar), Erik (guitar), and Anders (Digital Audio). This original incarnation of the band only lasted for a year and disbanded. During this time a live demo EP had been recorded. In 2004 the pair gathered four new members, most notably Christer Espevoll, formerly of Extol. The band recorded a demo of the song "Pandemonium", which was distributed among different record labels. After receiving good responses the band signed a deal with Tabu Recordings and released their first full-length Monument Bineothan which got the band nominated in the 35th Annual Spellemannsprisen for the metal category against Enslaved, Gorgoroth, and Keep of Kalessin. In August 2007 the band announced on their website that they would soon be recording their follow-up to "Monument" with acclaimed Danish producer Tue Madsen.

On 26 December 2007 via the band's official Myspace, Benea Reach announced their forthcoming album Alleviat, which was released in Scandinavia February 2008. Around October until November 2008, Benea Reach embarked on tour with The Chariot and The Satire. On 14 May 2009 the band confirmed via their official Myspace the departure of guitarist Håkon Sagen, earlier that year.
In October 2009 the band toured India, with concerts at The Great Indian Rock Festival in Pune, Delhi and Bangalore from 23–26 October and at Thomso '09 Cultural Festival of IIT Roorkee on 31 October. On 11 January 2014, Benea Reach announced that they would be disbanding after their last scheduled shows in March.

Influences
Marco Storm, drummer and primary spokesperson for the band, has mentioned in multiple interviews bands such as Meshuggah, Neurosis, and Botch as primary influences for their sound. More specifically the Meshuggah EP None. Other influences include The Dillinger Escape Plan, My Bloody Valentine, Cult of Luna, Tool, and Mastodon.

Members
Final line-up
Ilkka Volume - vocals (2003-2014) (Selfmindead)
Marco Storm - drums (2003-2014) (Selfmindead, ex-Serena-Maneesh)
Martin "Heddal" Sivertsen - guitars (2003-2014) (Mantric [Live])
Andreas Berglihn - guitars (2010-2014)
Mikael Wildén - bass guitar (2010-2014)
Thomas Wang - guitars, keyboards (2011-2014)

Former
Håkon Sagen - guitar (2003-2009) (Shining, ex-Marty Friedman [Live])
Christer Espevoll - guitar (2003-2011) (ex-Extol, ex-Absurd²)
Håkon Nakken - bass guitar (2003-2010) (Selfmindead)
Morten Holmquist - bass guitar (2003) (ex-Selfmindead)
Tor Erik Drangsland - guitars (2003) (ex-Selfmindead)
Alwin Nedrum - programming, guitars (2008-2011)
Tor Magne Glidje - guitars (2003) (Lengsel, ex-Extol, Mantric, ex-Ganglion)
Anders Lidal - programming, keyboards (2003) (Mantric)

Live musicians
Tommy Hjelm - guitars (2009)

Timeline

Discography
Studio albums
Monument Bineothan (2006)
Alleviat (2008)
Possession (2013)

Demo
Pandemonium (2004)

References

Norwegian industrial metal musical groups
Norwegian metalcore musical groups
Norwegian mathcore musical groups
Musical groups established in 2003
2003 establishments in Norway
Musical groups from Oslo